The Oryol Oblast Council of People's Deputies is the regional parliament of Oryol Oblast, a federal subject of Russia.

The council consists of 50 deputies elected for a term of five years.

Elections

2021

References 

Politics of Oryol Oblast
Oryol Oblast